Lupa may refer to:

Places
 Lupa Ward Ward in Chunya, Mbeya, Tanzania 
 Lupa Gold Field, in  Chunya, Mbeya, Tanzania
 Lupa Island (Hungary)
 Lupa Zoo, Ludlow, Massachusetts, United States
 Mount Lupa, Antarctica

Other
 Auguste Lupa, a fictional character in two pastiche novels by author John Lescroart
 Lupa (ship), an 18th-century Ottoman galley ship

See also
 La lupa (disambiguation)
 Lupae (disambiguation)